Crocidosema leprarum is a moth of the family Tortricidae. It was first described by Lord Walsingham in 1907. It is endemic to the Hawaiian islands of Oahu, Molokai, Nihoa, Necker, French Frigate Shoals and Laysan.

The larvae probably feed on Abutilon and Sida species.

External links

Eucosmini
Endemic moths of Hawaii
Moths described in 1907